Stephen Giddins (born 29 January 1961) is an English chess player and writer. He graduated from Keble College, Oxford, in Philosophy, Politics and Economics in 1982. He went on to become a FIDE Master and wrote a number of chess books, some of which have also been translated into German and Spanish.

He was the editor of British Chess Magazine from September 2010 to April 2011.

Books
 101 Chess Opening Traps, 1998
 How to Build Your Chess Opening Repertoire, 2003
 50 Essential Chess Lessons, 2006
 101 Chess Endgame Tips: golden nuggets of endgame wisdom, 2007
 50 Ways to Win at Chess, 2008

References

External links
 
 

1961 births
Living people
English chess players
British chess writers
British non-fiction writers
Chess FIDE Masters
Alumni of Keble College, Oxford
British male writers
Male non-fiction writers